Deep Tracks is a Sirius XM Radio channel featuring lesser-known classic rock music selections such as album tracks, one-hit wonders, concert recordings, "forgotten 45s" and "B-side" tracks.

Brian Beddow is Deep Tracks' current programming director. Earle Bailey is one of its on-air (and very deep) voices and has worked with American voice-over artist Ted Williams. Meg Griffin and Jim Ladd (with his themed sets programming) are also heard regularly on the channel during the week, with Dusty Street and Carol Miller appearing on weekends. The original programmer for the channel, George Taylor Morris, departed in the summer of 2008 due to health issues.

The station appears on SiriusXM Radio as channel 27. 
Originally it replaced The Vault as a part of the Sirius/XM merger in 2008. It can also be heard on Dish Network channel 6027(previously 6016) until Sirius XM's The Blend took Sirius XM Radio 16 and Dish Network 6016. As of April 2009, this channel has changed its logo, taking the logo from former XM channel Top Tracks, which was replaced by Classic Vinyl post-Sirius/XM merger.

The name is a remnant of XM's old classic rock stations: Big Tracks, Top Tracks, and Deep Tracks. Big Tracks became Classic Rewind. Top Tracks became Classic Vinyl.

For one week in January 2020, the station exclusively played music by Rush in tribute to the band's drummer Neil Peart, who died on January 7, 2020.

On October 6, 2020, the station started playing music by Van Halen in tribute to Eddie Van Halen, who died on the same day. The first song played was "Jamie's Cryin'".

Core artists 
Aerosmith
The Alan Parsons Project
Alice Cooper
Allman Brothers
Arlo Guthrie
The Band
Be Bop Deluxe
The Beach Boys
The Beatles and solo careers
Billy Joel
Blood, Sweat & Tears
Blue Öyster Cult
Bob Dylan
 Bob Seger & The Silver Bullet Band
Bonnie Raitt
Bruce Springsteen
The Byrds
Cactus
Camel
Canned Heat
Carole King
Cat Stevens
The Chambers Brothers
Cheap Trick
 Chicago
The Clash
Cream
Creedence Clearwater Revival
Crosby, Stills, Nash & Young
David Bowie
Deep Purple
Dire Straits
Donovan
Doobie Brothers
The Doors
Dr. John
Eagles
Electric Light Orchestra
Elton John
Eric Burdon and The Animals
Emerson, Lake & Palmer
Faces
Fairport Convention
Fleetwood Mac
Frank Zappa
Free
Genesis
George Thorogood
Grateful Dead
The Guess Who
Heart
Humble Pie
J. Geils Band
Jackson Browne
Janis Joplin
Joe Walsh and James Gang
John Prine
Jefferson Airplane
Jethro Tull
Jimi Hendrix Experience
Joe Cocker
Joe Jackson
John Mellencamp
Joni Mitchell
Kansas
King Crimson
The Kinks
Laura Nyro
Led Zeppelin
Leon Russell
Little Feat
Loggins & Messina
Los Lobos
Lynyrd Skynyrd
Manassas
Moby Grape
The Moody Blues
Mott the Hoople
Mountain
Neil Young & Crazy Horse
Nick Lowe
NRBQ
Otis Redding
Patti Smith
Paul Butterfield Blues Band
Peter Frampton
Pink Floyd
The Police
The Pretenders
Procol Harum
Queen
Quicksilver Messenger Service
Randy Newman
Rare Earth
The Rascals
Renaissance
REO Speedwagon
Richie Havens
Robert Palmer
The Rolling Stones
Roxy Music
Rush
Santana
Savoy Brown
The Sonics
Spirit
Simon & Garfunkel
Small Faces
Steely Dan
Steppenwolf
Steve Miller Band
Stevie Ray Vaughan
Supertramp
T. Rex
Taj Mahal
Ten Years After
Thin Lizzy
Tina Turner
Todd Rundgren
Tom Petty
Traffic
Van Morrison
War
Warren Zevon
Wishbone Ash
Yardbirds
Yes
The Who
U2
Velvet Underground
ZZ Top
The Zombies
10cc

Internet Player
One feature of the internet version is the ability to bias the player regarding how well known the artists played are. Another is to bias it toward artists from the Vinyl era or from the Rewind era.

References

External links
 SiriusXM: Deep Tracks

Sirius Satellite Radio channels
XM Satellite Radio channels
Sirius XM Radio channels
Classic rock radio stations in the United States
Radio stations established in 2001